"Money Longer" is the debut single by American rapper Lil Uzi Vert. It was released for digital download on February 6, 2016 as the first single from their fourth mixtape Lil Uzi Vert vs. the World, and as a bonus track from Japanese versions of their debut album Luv is Rage 2, by Generation Now and Atlantic Records. The whole song focuses on the idea that Lil Uzi Vert have now "turn[ed] into a savage" as is repeated throughout the song. The track was produced by Don Cannon and Maaly Raw.

Music video
On July 8, 2016, Uzi uploaded the music video for "Money Longer" on their YouTube account and it has received over 150 million views as of December 2020.

Commercial performance
"Money Longer" debuted at number 92 on Billboard Hot 100 for the chart dated July 2, 2016. As of date, it has peaked at number 54. The song was certified 2× Platinum by the Recording Industry Association of America (RIAA).

In popular culture
In 2018, the song became an Internet meme where the song's bass boosted instrumental was used in various edits with a green screen video of a silver alien dancing, often referred to as "Howard The Alien", and was associated with sleep paralysis.

Charts

Weekly charts

Year-end charts

Certifications

References

External links

2015 songs
2016 debut singles
Lil Uzi Vert songs
Songs written by Lil Uzi Vert
Internet memes
Songs written by Don Cannon
Song recordings produced by Don Cannon
Songs written by Maaly Raw